The following lists events that happened during 1994 in Cape Verde.

Incumbents
President: António Mascarenhas Monteiro
Prime Minister: Carlos Veiga

Events

Sports
CD Travadores of Praia won the Cape Verdean Football Championship

Births
June 6: Kevin Sousa
July 15: Jimmy Ines, footballer
September 1:
Ká Semedo, footballer
Lidiane Lopes, athlete

References

 
Years of the 20th century in Cape Verde
1990s in Cape Verde
Cape Verde
Cape Verde